The 2016–17 NBL Canada season was the sixth season of the National Basketball League of Canada (NBLC).

League changes
The league added two teams for 2016–17: the Cape Breton Highlanders in Sydney, Nova Scotia, and the KW Titans  in Kitchener, Ontario. The Saint John Mill Rats franchise also transferred ownership and was rebranded to the Saint John Riptide.

Offseason coaching changes 
 The Cape Breton Highlanders hired Dean Murray as their inaugural head coach.
 The Halifax Hurricanes hired Kevin Keathley to replace Hugo López. However, Keathley left the team in the pre-season for personal reasons and was then replaced by Mike Leslie.
 The KW Titans hired Serge Langis as their inaugural head coach.
 The Orangeville A's hired Brandon Lesovsky to replace Chris Thomas
 The Saint John Riptide retained Rob Spon as head coach during the franchise transition.
 The Windsor Express' head coach from 2014–15, Bill Jones, returned from his one-year suspension.

Midseason coaching changes
The Cape Breton Highlanders relieved inaugural head coach Dean Murray of his duties on January 22, 2017. The team promoted assistant coach Ben Resner to replace Murray.
The Niagara River Lions' head coach Grâce Lokole stepped down from his position and became the assistant coach on March 11, 2017. The team named current Niagara College head coach Keith Vassell as the interim head coach.

Regular season 
Source:
Atlantic Division

Central Division

Notes
z – Clinched home court advantage for the entire playoffs
c – Clinched home court advantage for the division playoffs
x – Clinched playoff spot

Attendance

1
1

Playoffs

Bold Series winner
Italic Team with home-court advantage

Awards

Player of the Week award

End-of-season awards
Source:
Most Valuable Players: Royce White, London Lightning
Canadian Player of the Year: Terry Thomas, Island Storm
Newcomer of the Year: Jahii Carson, Island Storm
Defensive Player of the Year: Rahlir Hollis-Jefferson, Orangeville A's
Rookie of the Year: Maurice Jones, Windsor Express
Sixth Man of the Year: Antoine Mason, Halifax Hurricanes
Coach of the Year: Kyle Julius, London Lightning

References

External links
NBL Canada website

 
National Basketball League of Canada seasons
NBL